Higby is a surname. Notable people with the surname include:

Higby (baseball), American baseball player
Lawrence Higby, American businessman and political activist
Lynn Carlton Higby (1938 – 1992), former United States federal judge 
Mary Higby Schweitzer, paleontologist at North Carolina State University 
Morgan Higby Night (born 1970), American writer, director, producer, and DJ
Wayne Higby (born 1943), American artist working in ceramics
Wilbur Higby (1867 – 1934), American actor 
William Higby (1813 – 1887), United States Representative from California
William Eugene Higby, 29th Lieutenant Governor of Colorado

See also
Higby, Ohio
Higby, Roane County, West Virginia
Higbee (disambiguation)